The Takatsu River is a river in Shimane Prefecture, Japan.

References

Rivers of Shimane Prefecture
Rivers of Japan